Weerakoon is a surname. Notable people with the surname include:

Ananda Weerakoon, Sri Lankan film actor in the 1950s
Bradman Weerakoon, CCS (born 1930), Sri Lankan civil servant
Chamind Weerakoon (born 1972), Sri Lankan former cricketer
Dharmasiri Weerakoon (1938–2008), Sri Lankan boxer
Esala Weerakoon, Sri Lankan diplomat, SAARC Secretary General
Gothamie Weerakoon, Sri Lankan based botanist, lichenologist and environmentalist living in London
Gunaratna Weerakoon, Sri Lankan politician
Noel Weerakoon, CA, Sri Lankan army officer
Patricia Weerakoon, Australian Christian sexologist
Sajeewa Weerakoon (born 1978), former Sri Lankan ODI cricketer
Sanath Weerakoon, Sri Lankan former government agent
Taneesha Weerakoon (born 1996), Sri Lankan cricketer

Sinhalese surnames